Rodrigo Costa is a former Brazilian association football forward who played professionally in the United States.

Costa attended Union College where he was a 1996, 1997 and 1998 NAIA Honorable Mention All American soccer player.  He holds the Union College record for career goals.  During the 1997 and 1998 collegiate off-seasons, Costa played for the Detroit Dynamite of the Premier Development Soccer League.  In 1997, he led the league in scoring en route to earning Rookie of the Year.  In 1998, he was the PDSL MVP.  In 1999, Costa moved to the Mid Michigan Bucks for one season.  In 2000, he played for the Chicago Sockers.  That season, the Sockers won the league title by defeating the Mid Michigan Bucks, 1-0, in the championship game on a goal by Costa.  On January 18, 2001, Costa signed with the Indiana Blast of the USL A-League.  He played four seasons with Indiana.

References

Living people
1976 births
Brazilian footballers
Brazilian expatriate footballers
Chicago Sockers players
Indiana Blast players
Flint City Bucks players
USL League Two players
A-League (1995–2004) players
Association football forwards
Footballers from São Paulo